The EFL Championship is a professional football league in England which is the second tier of the English football league system.

Some of the people have served spells as caretaker (temporary) managers in the period between a managerial departure and appointment.

An asterisk (*) indicates that the manager is currently managing the EFL Championship club his name is next to.

List of managers by club
The dates of appointment and departure may fall outside the club's period in the EFL Championship.

Notes

References

Managers
Football managers in England
EFL Championship